Montgomery (also spelled Montgomerie) is a toponymic surname derived from Saint-Germain-de-Montgommery and Sainte-Foy-de-Montgommery in Normandy, France.

The earliest known person to be styled with the name is Roger de Montgomerie, found in a contemporary document as father of the 11th century Norman nobleman, Roger de Montgomery, 1st Earl of Shrewsbury, who owned the village of Montgommery, today in the Calvados département. Alternatively, a Hugh de Montgomery is given as the earl's father by a Norman chronicler writing in the next generation and some have hypothesized an error whereby Hugh is actually father of the elder Roger.

The original family Counts de Montgomerie were prominent in early Anglo-Norman England and gave their name to Montgomeryshire in neighbouring Wales. In some cases, the surname of modern Montgomerys is probably derived from this Welsh place name (the Scottish Montgomerys for example). Seventeen counties in the United States of America as well as districts, neighbourhoods and streets around the world, have been named for people named Montgomery.

In Scotland, the surname has occasionally been gaelicized as Mac Gumaraid, and in Ireland as Mac Iomaire.

Montgomery may refer to:

Surname

Family
 Montgomerie family, Earls of Shrewsbury, a noble family of Anglo-Norman origin
 Clan Montgomery, a Lowland Scottish clan

A
 Al Montgomery (1920–1942), American baseball player
 Alan Montgomery (born 1938), British diplomat
 Alexander Montgomerie (disambiguation), multiple people
 Alexander Montgomery (disambiguation), multiple people
 Anne Montgomery (disambiguation), multiple people
 Anthony Montgomery (born 1971), American actor
 Anthony Montgomery (American football) (born 1984), American football player
 Archibald Montgomerie (1812–1861), British politician

B
 Ben Montgomery (1819–1877), American inventor
 Bernard Montgomery (1887–1976), British army officer
 Bob Montgomery (disambiguation), multiple people
 Brent Montgomery, American entrepreneur
 Brett Montgomery (born 1973), Australian rules footballer
 Brian D. Montgomery (born 1956), American politician
 Bryan Montgomery (1946–2008), American actor

C
 Charles Montgomery (disambiguation), multiple people
 Chase Montgomery (born 1983), American stock car racing driver
 Chris Montgomery (born 1972), American multimedia programmer
 Chris Montgomery (rugby league), Australian rugby league footballer
 Cliff Montgomery (1910–2005), American football player
 Colin Montgomerie (born 1963), Scottish professional golfer
 Cynthia A. Montgomery (born 1952), American economist

D
 Dabney Montgomery (1923–2016), American air force officer
 Dacre Montgomery (born 1994), Australian actor
 Daniel Montgomery Jr. (1765–1831), American pioneer
 David Montgomery (disambiguation), multiple people
 Deane Montgomery (1909–1992), American mathematician
 Derek Montgomery (born 1950, English footballer
D. J. Montgomery (born 1996), American football player
 Douglass Montgomery (1909–1966), American actor

E
 Earl Montgomery (1894–1966), American film director
 Edmund Montgomery (1835–1911), Scottish-American philosopher
 Edward Montgomery (disambiguation), multiple people
 E. J. Montgomery (born 1999), American basketball player
 Eleanor Montgomery (1946–2013), American high jumper
 Elizabeth Montgomery (disambiguation), multiple people

F
 Flora Montgomery (born 1974), British actress
 Florence Montgomery (1843–1923), English novelist and children's writer
 Florence M. Montgomery (1914–1998), American art historian and curator
 Frank Montgomery (disambiguation), multiple people

G
 George Montgomery (disambiguation), multiple people
 Glenn Montgomery (1967–1998), American football player
 Gustaf Adolf Montgomery (1790–1861), Finnish colonel who served in the Finnish War

H
 Henry Montgomery (disambiguation), multiple people
 Howard Montgomery (1916–1980), American football and basketball player
 Hugh Montgomery (disambiguation), multiple people

J
 Jack Montgomery (disambiguation), multiple people
 Janet Montgomery (born 1985), British actress
 James Montgomery (disambiguation), multiple people
 Jeff Montgomery (disambiguation), multiple people
 Jerry Montgomery (born 1979), American football player and coach
 Jessie Montgomery, American composer
 Jessie Montgomery (Exeter), education and suffrage activist
 Jim Montgomery (disambiguation), multiple people
 Joe Montgomery (born 1976), American football player
 Joe D. Montgomery (1918–2013), American politician and educator
 John Montgomerie (disambiguation), multiple people
 John Montgomery (disambiguation), multiple people
 Jon Montgomery (born 1979), Canadian skeleton racer
 Jordan Montgomery (born 1992), American baseball player
 Joseph Montgomery (1733–1794), American minister

K
 Kenneth Montgomery (1943–2023), British conductor
 Kenneth Barbour Montgomery (1897–1965), English air force officer

L
 Lee Montgomery (born 1961), Canadian-American actor
 Lemuel P. Montgomery (1786–1814), American military officer
 Lewis Montgomery (??–1568), English politician
 Lisa Montgomery (disambiguation), multiple people
 Little Brother Montgomery (1906–1985), American musician
 Lucy Maud Montgomery (1874–1942), Canadian author
 Luke Montgomery (born 1973/1974), American activist

M
 Malcolm B. Montgomery (1891–1974), Justice of the Supreme Court of Mississippi
 Marion Montgomery (1934–2002), American jazz singer
 Marjorie Montgomery (1912–1991), American dancer and fashion designer
 Mary Montgomery (1956–2017), American swimmer
 Matthew Montgomery (disambiguation), multiple people
 Mike Montgomery (disambiguation), multiple people
 Milton Montgomery (1825–1897), American army officer
 Monty Montgomery (disambiguation), multiple people

N
 Nicholas Montgomery (disambiguation), multiple people
 Nick Montgomery (born 1981), British footballer

O
 Olan Montgomery (1963–2020), American actor
 Olea Marion Davis (1899 – 1977), Canadian artist and craftsperson born Olea Marion Montgomery
 Oscar Montgomery (1895–1967), New Zealand cricket umpire
 Oscar H. Montgomery (1859–1936), Justice of the Indiana Supreme Court

P
 Paul Montgomery (1960–1999), American entrepreneur and inventor
 Paul L. Montgomery (1936–2008), American reporter
 Percy Montgomery (born 1974), South African rugby union footballer
 Peter Montgomery (disambiguation), multiple people
 Poppy Montgomery (born 1972), Australian actor

R
 R. A. Montgomery (1936–2014), American author
 Ray Montgomerie (born 1961), Scottish footballer
 Ray Montgomery (disambiguation), multiple people
 Richard Montgomery (disambiguation), multiple people
 Robert Montgomerie (disambiguation), multiple people
 Robert Montgomery (disambiguation), multiple people
 Roger Montgomery (disambiguation), multiple people
 Ruth Montgomery (1912–2001), American journalist
 Ryan Daniel Montgomery (born 1977), Royce da 5'9" American rapper and songwriter

S
 Sam Montgomery (born 1990), American football player
 Samuel J. Montgomery (1896–1957), American politician
 Scott Montgomery (disambiguation), multiple people
 Seth D. Montgomery (1937–1998), American judge
 Seton Montolieu Montgomerie (1846–1883), English noble
 Sonny Montgomery (1920–2006), American army officer and politician
 Stan Montgomery (1920–2000), English footballer
 Steve Montgomery (born 1970), American baseball player
 Steven Montgomery (born 1954), American artist
 Sy Montgomery (born 1958), American naturalist, author and scriptwriter

T
 Thomas George Montgomerie (1830–1878), British Army officer and geographer
 Thomas Montgomery (disambiguation), multiple people
 Tim Montgomery (born 1975), American athlete
 Ty Montgomery (born 1993), American football player

V
 Viva Seton Montgomerie (1879–1959), British author and socialite

W
 Wes Montgomery (1923–1968), American jazz guitarist
 William Montgomerie (1797–1856), Scottish military surgeon with East India Company in Singapore
 William Montgomery (disambiguation), multiple people

Z
 Zachariah Montgomery (1825–1900), American politician

Middle name
 James Montgomery Rice (1842–1912), American lawyer and politician

Given name
 Montgomery Atwater (1904–1976), American author and outdoorsman
 Montgomery Bell (1769–1855), American manufacturing entrepreneur
 Montgomery P. Berry (1824–1898), American commander and politician
 Montgomery Blair (1813–1883), American politician and lawyer
 Montgomery Clift (1920–1966), American film and stage actor
 Montgomery Dent Corse (1816–1895), American banker and gold prospector
 Montgomery Kaluhiokalani (1958–2013), American surfer
 Montgomery Knight (1901–1943), American aeronautical engineer
 Montgomery Oliver Koelsch (1912–1992), United States federal judge
 Montgomery McFate (born 1966), American cultural anthropologist
 Montgomery Meigs (disambiguation), multiple people
 Montgomery Pittman (1917–1962), American television director
 Montgomery Schuyler (1843–1914), American architect and critic
 Montgomery Schuyler Jr. (1877–1955), American diplomat
 Montgomery Sicard (1836–1900), American army officer
 Montgomery Slatkin (born 1945), American biologist
 Montgomery Steele, Canadian country music artist
 Montgomery M. Taylor (1869–1952), American naval officer
 Montgomery Tully (1904–1988), Irish film director
 Montgomery Wilson (1909–1964), Canadian figure skater

Fictional characters

As a Given Name
 Charles Montgomery Burns, a character from the animated sitcom The Simpsons
 Montgomery, Doctor Moreau's assistant from the science fiction novel The Island of Doctor Moreau
 Montgomery “Monty” de la Cruz, a character in the Netflix series 13 Reasons Why
 Montgomery Fiske, character on the Disney animated series Kim Possible
 Montgomery Gator, character from the video game Five Nights at Freddy's: Security Breach
 Montgomery "Lightning" McQueen, the main protagonist from the Cars film franchise
 Montgomery Montgomery, character from the black-comedy drama A Series of Unfortunate Events
 Montgomery Moose, character from the animated series The Get Along Gang
 Montgomery "Scotty" Scott, character on Star Trek

As a Surname
 Addison Montgomery, character on ABC's Grey's Anatomy and Private Practice
 Aria Montgomery, a character from the Pretty Little Liars franchise
 Bianca Montgomery, a character from the daytime drama All My Children
 Jackson Montgomery, a character from the daytime drama All My Children
 James "Hunter" Montgomery, character in the television series Queer as Folk
 Layton T. Montgomery, a lawyer and secondary antagonist in DreamWorks Animation film Bee Movie
 Lloyd Montgomery Garmadon, a character in the Ninjago TV series and THe Lego Ninjago Movie
 Madison Montgomery, character on the third season of FX's American Horror Story 
 Nora Montgomery, character on the first season of FX's American Horror Story

See also
Montgomery (disambiguation)
Montgomery v Lanarkshire Health Board

References

English-language surnames
Lists of people by surname
Scottish surnames
Surnames of Norman origin
English masculine given names
Scottish masculine given names